Hoseynabad-e Molla Amir (also Romanized as Ḩoseynābād-e Mollā Amīr and Hosein Abad Molla Amir) is a village in Chahdegal Rural District, Negin Kavir District, Fahraj County, Kerman Province, Iran. At the 2006 census, its population was 330, in 79 families.

References 

Populated places in Fahraj County